Seamus F Mallon, (born 21 November 1980) is an Irish former professional rugby union player for Ulster Rugby in the Celtic League, and Northampton Saints in the Guinness Premiership.

Rugby career
Mallon played for his school-teams, Foyle and Derry College and St. Columb's College in Derry and Ulster. 

He signed for Northampton Saints in July 2005.

He now plays his rugby for Dungannon RFC where he is also a coach.

Personal life
Mallon was employed at the Wallace High School in Lisburn for a short period of time, but left in 2014 to take up a position at Cambridge house, Ballymena, as a Technology & Design teacher, where he taught until 2020 when he left to take up a position at Methodist College Belfast, Belfast, where teaches as a Technology and Design teacher.

References

External links
Seamus Mallon profile Northampton Saints (Archived)
Saints sign young centre Seamus Mallon Northampton Saints, 4 July 2005 (Archived)

1980 births
Living people
Irish rugby union players
Northampton Saints players
People educated at Foyle College
People educated at St Columb's College
Rugby union players from County Londonderry
Sportspeople from Derry (city)
Ulster Rugby players